Troy Leonard Baxter Jr. (born March 5, 1996) is an American professional basketball player for San José of the Liga Sudamericana de Básquetbol (LSB). He played college basketball for the UNLV Runnin' Rebels, Florida Gulf Coast Eagles and Morgan State Bears.

High school career
Baxter attended Oldsmar Christian School in Oldsmar, Florida. He saw his stock rise as he played for Team Breakdown in the Under Armour Association in 2015. Baxter committed to play college basketball for the South Florida Bulls on May 1, 2015.

Baxter averaged 17 points, 7 rebounds and 1.5 blocks as a senior during the 2015–16 season. He was rated as a four-star recruit and ranked 90th in the ESPN 100. Baxter won the 2016 American Family Insurance High School Slam Dunk Contest. On August 27, 2016, it was reported that Baxter had been released from his letter of intent with South Florida. On September 1, 2016, he committed to the UNLV Runnin' Rebels.

College career

UNLV (2016–2017)
Baxter averaged 4.3 points and 2.3 rebounds per game during his freshman season with the UNLV Runnin' Rebels. His playing time did not meet his expectations and the Runnin' Rebels only won four games in conference play. On March 30, 2017, Baxter announced that he would not return to the Runnin' Rebels.

Florida Gulf Coast (2017–2019)
On June 20, 2017, Baxter committed to play for the Florida Gulf Coast Eagles. He had to sit out the 2017–18 due to National Collegiate Athletic Association (NCAA) transfer rules. Baxter treated practice sessions as his game time and credits the period with helping him develop a better feel for basketball.

Baxter averaged 7.5 points, 2.9 rebounds, 1.1 assists and 1.1 blocks per game during the 2018–19 season. On April 5, 2019, he declared for the 2019 NBA draft. He did not sign with an agent and was eligible to return to college. Baxter elected to return after not liking his draft chances but announced his intention to transfer.

Morgan State (2019–2021)
Baxter desired to transfer to a team with coaches that had experience sending players to the National Basketball Association (NBA). He chose the Morgan State Bears for their head coach Kevin Broadus who had coached 12 future NBA players during his college career.

Baxter averaged 10.2 points and 5.1 rebounds per game during the 2019–20 season. His 1.9 blocks per game were the second highest in the Mid-Eastern Athletic Conference (MEAC).

Baxter averaged 15.5 points, 4.4 rebounds and 1.6 blocks per game during the 2020–21 season. He was selected to the All-MEAC First Team and the All-Defensive Team. He won the 2021 Great Clips Slam Dunk Championship and became the first player to win slam dunk titles in high school and college. On August 9, 2021, Baxter was named as the MEAC Male Student-Athlete of the Year for his academic and extracurricular work.

Professional career

NBA G League stints (2021–2022)
After going undrafted in the 2021 NBA draft, Baxter joined the Chicago Bulls for the 2021 NBA Summer League. On October 15, 2021, he signed a contract with the Bulls, but was waived the next day. Baxter joined the Windy City Bulls of the NBA G League as an affiliate player. He was then later waived on February 1, 2022.

Baxter was acquired by the Wisconsin Herd of the NBA G League on February 2, 2022, but was waived on February 6.

On February 14, 2022, Baxter was acquired by the Grand Rapids Gold. Baxter was then later waived on March 3, 2022.

On March 18, 2022, Baxter was acquired via available player pool by the Fort Wayne Mad Ants.

Overseas (2022–present)
On April 28, 2022, Baxter signed with Indios de San Francisco of the Dominican Liga Nacional de Baloncesto (LNB).

Baxter joined Deportivo San José of the Liga Sudamericana de Básquetbol for the 2022 season.

Personal life
Baxter is the son of Dianna and Troy Baxter Sr. He has a daughter who was born in June 2020. Baxter cites LeBron James as his idol due to his activism.

References

External links

College statistics
Morgan State Bears bio
Florida Gulf Coast Eagles bio

1996 births
Living people
21st-century African-American sportspeople
African-American basketball players
American expatriate basketball people in Paraguay
American expatriate basketball people in the Dominican Republic
American men's basketball players
Basketball players from Tallahassee, Florida
Florida Gulf Coast Eagles men's basketball players
Fort Wayne Mad Ants players
Forwards (basketball)
Grand Rapids Gold players
Morgan State Bears men's basketball players
UNLV Runnin' Rebels basketball players
Windy City Bulls players
Wisconsin Herd players